Terebrirostra is an extinct genus of brachiopod from the Cretaceous of Europe.

Sources

 Fossils (Smithsonian Handbooks) by David Ward (Page 91)

External links
Terebrirostra in the Paleobiology Database

Prehistoric brachiopod genera
Cretaceous brachiopods
Prehistoric animals of Europe
Terebratulida